Gvozdovka is a rural locality (a khutor) in Maryevskoye Rural Settlement, Olkhovatsky District, Voronezh Oblast, Russia. The population was 579 as of 2010. There are 5 streets.

Geography 
Gvozdovka is located on the Chyornaya Kalitva River, 13 km northwest of Olkhovatka (the district's administrative centre) by road. Maryevka is the nearest rural locality.

References 

Rural localities in Olkhovatsky District